Salihler is a Turkish place name and may refer to the following places in Turkey:

 Salihler, Akseki, a village in Akseki district of Antalya Province
 Salihler, Çanakkale
 Salihler, Dikili, a village in Dikili district of İzmir Province
 Salihler, Emirdağ, a village in Emirdağ district of Afyon Province
 Salihler, Güdül, a village in Güdül district of Ankara Province